Singer Glacier is a glacier flowing east-northeast from Martin Peninsula between Slichter Foreland and Smythe Shoulder into Dotson Ice Shelf, on Walgreen Coast, Marie Byrd Land. Mapped by United States Geological Survey (USGS) from surveys and U.S. Navy aerial photographs, 1959–67, and Landsat imagery, 1972–73. Named in 1977 by Advisory Committee on Antarctic Names (US-ACAN) after Howard Singer, geophysicist, University of California, Los Angeles, a member of the United States Antarctic Research Program (USARP) winter party at South Pole Station, 1973.

References

Glaciers of Marie Byrd Land